The Second Congressional Commission on Education (EDCOM II) is a Philippine Congressional entity created by the 18th Congress of the Philippines.

The body was created by virtue of Republic Act 11899, which lapsed into law on July 23, 2022.

The commission is tasked to conduct a national review of the country's education sector after the COVID-19 pandemic exacted a heavy toll on learning.

Chairpersons 
The Education Commission is headed by four co-chairpersons who lead the Commission jointly - two from the Senate of the Philippines, and two from the House of Representatives.

In total, the commission has ten members, with five members from the Senate and five members from the House of Representatives.

Advisory Council 
The commission is guided by an Education, Legislation and Policy Advisory Council, selected by the Senate President and the Speaker of the House of Representatives from a pool of recognized experts from the following sectors: the academe, the business sector, government education agencies, heads of LGUs, and from civil society organizations and development partners engaged in education.

References

Congress of the Philippines
Senate of the Philippines
House of Representatives of the Philippines